Powerplant is the second studio album by American band Girlpool. It was released on May 12, 2017 through Anti-.

Composition
The songs on Powerplant have been seen as "blink-and-you'll-miss-em grunge lullabies", as well as having the "loud-quiet-loudness" of alternative rock throughout. The employment of lo-fi and noise has also been seen in its music, like the distortion used in "Soup".

Critical reception

Powerplant was welcomed with critical applause upon its release. On Metacritic, it has a score of 80 out of 100, indicating "generally favorable reviews", based on 14 reviews.

Accolades

Track listing

Personnel
Girlpool
 Avery Tucker - leading vocals, guitar
 Harmony Tividad - leading vocals, bass guitar
 Miles Wintner - drums

Technical
 Drew Fischer - engineer
 Heba Kadry - mastering

Artwork and design
 Jaxon Demme - artwork

References

2017 albums
Anti- (record label) albums
Girlpool albums